Almost Heathen is the third studio album by the stoner rock band Karma to Burn, released in 2001 via Spitfire Records. It was the last album released before their seven-year disbandment in 2002. The album was reissued in 2022 by Heavy Psych Sounds Records.

The album title is a play on the former slogan of West Virginia, "Almost Heaven".

Reception

Exclaim! wrote that "you either get the fact that they are an all-instrumental trio playing groovy, fuzzed-out rock or you don't ... the trio breaks down into more funky terrain." The Evening Times thought that "the listener is assailed by driving tracks of musical virtuosity where the guitars are to the fore." The Palm Beach Post called the tracks "hypnotic" and "a heavy blend of fuzzy guitars and relentless drums."

Track listing

Note
 The live bonus tracks "Seven" and "Eight" are titled incorrectly as they are actually the songs "Ten" and "Eleven", respectively.

Personnel
William Mecum – guitar
Rich Mullins – bass
Rob Oswald – drums

References 

Karma to Burn albums
2001 albums
Instrumental rock albums
Spitfire Records albums